The Victoria Cross (VC) is a military decoration that may be bestowed upon members of the British or Commonwealth armed forces for acts of valour or gallantry performed in the face of the enemy. Within the British honours system and those of many Commonwealth nations it is the highest award a soldier can receive for actions in combat. It was established in 1856 and since then has been awarded 1,356 times, including three service personnel who were awarded the VC twice.

The VC was introduced on 29 January 1856 by Queen Victoria to reward acts of valour during the Crimean War. The traditional explanation of the source of the gunmetal from which the medals are struck is that it derives from Russian cannon captured at the siege of Sevastopol. Recent research has thrown doubt on this story, suggesting a variety of origins. The original Royal Warrant did not contain a specific clause regarding posthumous awards, although official policy was to not award the VC posthumously. Between 1897 and 1901, several notices were issued in the London Gazette regarding soldiers who would have been awarded the VC had they survived. In a partial reversal of policy in 1902, six of the soldiers mentioned were granted the VC, but not "officially" awarded the medal. In 1907, the posthumous policy was completely reversed and medals were sent to the next of kin of the six officers and men. The Victoria Cross warrant was not officially amended to explicitly allow posthumous awards until 1920 but one quarter of all awards for the First World War were posthumous.

Due to its rarity, the VC is highly prized and the medal has fetched over £400,000 at auction. A number of public and private collections are devoted to the Victoria Cross. The private collection of Lord Ashcroft, amassed since 1986, contains over one-tenth of all VCs awarded. Following a 2008 donation to the Imperial War Museum, the Ashcroft collection went on public display alongside the museum's Victoria and George Cross collection in November 2010. Since 1990, three Commonwealth countries that retain the Queen as head of state have instituted their own versions of the VC. As a result, the original Victoria Cross is sometimes referred to as the "Commonwealth Victoria Cross" or the "Imperial Victoria Cross", to distinguish it from the newer awards.

There have been medical officers in the English Army since a regular standing army was formed, following the restoration of Charles II in 1660, a practice that continues to the present day. Each regiment had a medical officer and assistants working in their regimental hospital. By the 1700s the Commander-in-Chief of the Forces the Duke of Marlborough John Churchill had introduced the forerunners of the field ambulance, to accompany the British Army of its campaigns. However it was not until the Napoleonic Wars, when the British were fighting in Spain that any kind of organised medical service was formed. The next major conflict fought by the British Army was the Crimean War, where the first three of forty Victoria Crosses were awarded to medical personnel. The forty-one awards include two of only three men, Noel Chavasse and Arthur Martin-Leake, to receive a second award and the youngest recipient Andrew Fitzgibbon aged fifteen years and 100 days.
The medical recipients not only include physicians and surgeons but also other medical personnel like Henry Harden, killed when collecting wounded off the battlefield, or the afore mentioned Fitzgibbon who was a Hospital Apprentice. Among the thirty-eight medical recipients of the Victoria Cross, are representatives from the British, Canadian, Australian and the former British Indian Army.

Medical recipients

References 

 

 
Royal Army Medical Corps
Medical